Amarillo by Morning is a documentary short by Spike Jonze.

Synopsis 
While filming pro bullriders for a commercial at the national rodeo in the Houston Astrodome in Houston, Texas, Spike befriended two suburban teenagers who aspired to be cowboys. The documentary chronicles an afternoon in their lives.

Release 
Amarillo by Morning was initially screened in 1997, his first released documentary and second film. The short was re-released in 2003 by Palm Pictures as part of a collection of Jonze's "music videos, short films, documentaries, and rarities", accompanied by interviews and commentaries on the director's works.

In 2009 Amarillo by Morning was screened at the Museum of Modern Art in New York City as part of a retrospective on Jonze's work.

Reception 
Critical reception for the short after its initial release has been positive. In the book ReFocus: The Films of Spike Jonze Laurel Westrup noted that the short "diverges substantially from the irreverent charm of his narrative ads and music videos. However, it reveals some key thematic features and an emphasis on creative collaboration that carry into the Suburbs films." The Village Voice has also praised the work, calling it "a perfect, unpretentious short doc tagging a crew of suburbanite Houston teens who get together to ride a homemade mechanical bull and dream of future rodeo glory. "

References

External links 
 

Films shot in Houston
Films directed by Spike Jonze
1997 films
Cowboy culture
1990s short documentary films
American short documentary films
1997 documentary films
1998 films
1990s English-language films
1990s American films